Mari Paz Mosanga Motanga (born 16 October 1982) is an Equatoguinean sprinter. She competed in the women's 100 metres at the 2000 Summer Olympics.

References

1982 births
Living people
Athletes (track and field) at the 2000 Summer Olympics
Equatoguinean female sprinters
Olympic athletes of Equatorial Guinea
Place of birth missing (living people)